Trevor Moore  may refer to:

Trevor Moore (comedian) (1980–2021), American comedian, actor, and writer
Trevor Moore (sailor) (born c. 1985), American sailor who competed at the 2012 Summer Olympics 
Trevor Moore (ice hockey) (born 1995), American professional ice hockey player